The Caulfield Autumn Classic is a Melbourne Racing Club Group 2 Thoroughbred horse race for horses three years old held under Set Weights conditions, over a distance of 1800 metres at Caulfield Racecourse in Melbourne, Australia in February. Total prizemoney for the race is A$300,000.

History

Name
 1957–1986  -  Stanley Plate
 1987–1990  -  Caulfield Autumn Classic
 1991  -  Tattersalls Classic
 1991–1997 - Caulfield Autumn Classic
 1998–2000  -  AAMI Classic
 2001–2004  -  Shannons Classic
 2005–2006 - Caulfield Autumn Classic
 2007 - National Jockey Celebration Day
 2008  -  Pol Roger Stakes
 2009 - The Yalumba 160
 2010 - The Yalumba 161
 2011 - The Yalumba 162
 2012 onwards - Caulfield Autumn Classic

Distance
 1957–1970 - 1 miles (~2000 metres)
 1971 - 1 (~1800 metres)
 1972 - 1 miles (~2000 metres)
 1973–1986 – 2000 metres
 1987 onwards - 1800 metres

Grade
 1957–1978  - Principal Race
 1979–1988  - Listed Race
 1989–1993  - Group 3
 1994 onwards Group 2

Venue
In 1996 the event was held at Flemington Racecourse due to reconstruction of Caulfield Racecourse.  In 2023 the race was held at Sandown Racecourse.

Winners
 
 2023 - Pericles
 2022 - Castlereagh Kid
 2021 - Parure
 2020 - Adelaide Ace
 2019 - Global Exchange
 2018 - Valiant Spirit
 2017 - Farson
 2016 - Tally 
 2015 - Alpine Eagle 
 2014 - Vilanova
 2013 - Super Cool
 2012 - Upbeat
 2011 - Folding Gear
 2010 - Extra Zero
 2009 - Stokehouse
 2008 - Brom Brom
 2007 - Ambitious General
 2006 - Spinney
 2005 - Renewable
 2004 - Elvstroem
 2003 - Natural Blitz
 2002 - Don Eduardo
 2001 - Fubu
 2000 - Pins
 1999 - Dignity Dancer
 1998 - Gold Guru
 1997 - Silver Glade
 1996 - Iron Horse
 1995 - Hurricane Sky
 1994 - Waikikamukau
 1993 - Redding
 1992 - Laranto
 1991 - Triscay
 1990 - Stylish Century
 1989 - King’s High
 1988 - Mr.Danamite
 1987 - Myocard
 1986 - Normandy Bay
 1985 - Playful Monarch
 1984 - Tri-Flow
 1983 - Admiral Lincoln
 1982 - Gurner's Lane
 1981 - Find The Gold
 1980 - Mr.Independent
 1979 - Double Century
 1978 - Father’s Day
 1977 - Blue Monarch
 1976 - Ready O’Ready
 1975 - Classic Conquest
 1974 - Sequester
 1973 - Red Cast
 1972 - Hampton’s Pride
 1971 - Royal Guardsman
 1970 - Voleur
 1969 - Aventyl
 1968 - Chosen Lady
 1967 - Pharaon
 1966 - Naval Brass
 1965 - Matloch
 1964 - Spotted
 1963 - Soldate
 1962 - Blue Era
 1961 - Reinsman
 1960 - Nilarco
 1959 - High Peal
 1958 - Wool Man
 1957 - Lord Gavin

See also
 List of Australian Group races
 Group races

References

Horse races in Australia
Caulfield Racecourse
1957 establishments in Australia
Recurring sporting events established in 1957